Pawtucket Slaters may refer to:

 Pawtucket Slaters (baseball), a team in the New England League from 1946 to 1949
 Pawtucket Slaters (basketball), a team in the American Basketball League from 1952 to 1953